Robert Howard Cantor is an American singer-songwriter and creator of multiple viral videos. He is mostly known as a vocalist, guitarist, and co-writer for the "fabloo" indie rock band Tally Hall.

In addition, Cantor is also known for his solo work as a comedy musician and viral video creator, particularly from the viral comedy song "Shia LaBeouf", in which actor Shia LaBeouf is depicted as a cannibalistic serial killer. His other work has included a solo album titled Not a Trampoline, and another viral video, "29 Celebrity Impressions, 1 Original Song".

Early life
Cantor was born and raised in Bloomfield Hills, Michigan.He is Jewish. 

Later, in 2002, while attending University of Michigan, he formed Tally Hall with bassist Zubin Sedghi and musician Andrew Horowitz. He majored in molecular biology, with a minor in nonprofessional music. He graduated in 2005, and turned down a full scholarship to medical school in order to pursue music full-time with Tally Hall.

Career

Tally Hall
Between 2002 and 2011, Cantor performed as a guitarist and vocalist of the Michigan-based band Tally Hall. Tally Hall is currently on hiatus. The band's five members are distinguished by the color of their neckties, with Cantor's signature color being yellow.

Cantor's career as a member of Tally Hall saw the release of two full-length albums: Marvin's Marvelous Mechanical Museum (2005), and Good & Evil (2011). The band also released one full demo album, titled Complete Demos (2004).

Viral videos
Since 2011, Cantor has worked on multiple viral projects, including songs and corresponding viral videos, posted on his SoundCloud and YouTube pages. In 2012, he released the comedy songs "Christian Bale Is at Your Party" and "Shia LaBeouf" (also known as "Actual Cannibal Shia LaBeouf"). In the latter, Cantor narrates a story about the actor Shia LaBeouf as a cannibalistic serial killer. Cantor posted a demo of the song to his SoundCloud page, from which it spread virally.

On July 1, 2014, Cantor posted a video titled "29 Celebrity Impressions, 1 Original Song", in which he and Tally Hall member Andrew Horowitz performed Cantor's song "Perfect" in 29 different celebrity impressions. A week later, he released a making-of video, demonstrating that the act was a hoax done through audio and video editing, and in fact featured 11 different impressionists.

On October 21, 2014, Cantor posted a video titled "'Shia LaBeouf' – Live", the music video to his 2012 song of the same name. The video is a mockup of a live concert, featuring numerous dancers and performers, primarily the Gay Men's Chorus of Los Angeles, the West Los Angeles Children's Choir, and the Argus Quartet. At the end of the video, the actor Shia LaBeouf is seen applauding the performance, in a parody of a scene from Citizen Kane. Cantor has stated that the video took four months to organize and one day to shoot, and that it was worked on by 161 people, including Cantor's former musical collaborators Zubin Sedghi, Bora Karaca and Zach Krasman.

Not a Trampoline and other work
During Tally Hall's hiatus, Cantor has focused on his solo career, working as a commercial songwriter and eventually releasing a solo album, Not a Trampoline, in 2014.
In recent years, Cantor has done a notable amount of work with Disney Junior contributing his musical talents to the soundtracks of multiple shows, including T.O.T.S. and The Ghost and Molly McGee. He frequently partners with Genevieve Goings in producing Disney-affiliated nursery rhymes, lullabies, and other simple children's songs, and The Ghost and Molly McGee features one-minute Cantor originals once per each episode.

References

21st-century American comedians
21st-century American singers
21st-century American male singers
American comedy musicians
American male singer-songwriters
Living people
Singer-songwriters from Michigan
University of Michigan alumni
1983 births